Allen Alley (born August 3, 1954) is an American businessman and politician from the State of Oregon. He sought the Republican nomination for Governor of Oregon in the 2016 Oregon gubernatorial special election, losing to Bud Pierce. Alley also sought the Republican nomination in 2010, but lost to Chris Dudley. Alley was the Republican nominee for Oregon State Treasurer in 2008 and also served as chairman of the Oregon Republican Party from January 2011 to February 2013.

Early life and education
Alley was born in Kalamazoo, Michigan, United States, the son of Nafe and Behle Alley. His father, a mechanical engineer, began his career designing conveyor systems before joining the Boeing Company. The family lived in several different cities, including Seattle and Philadelphia where Allen attended Nether Providence High School.

In 1976, Alley graduated from Purdue University with a degree in mechanical engineering and a minor in business.

Career

Business 
He went to work for the Ford Motor Company and then Boeing in various product engineering and design roles. Alley joined Computervision as director of Product Marketing in Boston, Massachusetts. From there, he was recruited to join Battery Ventures, a $75 million investment company that specialized in high-technology ventures. In 1992, Alley moved to Oregon to work for InFocus, a manufacturer of mobile business display hardware, where he served as vice president of corporate development, engineering, and marketing. In 1997, Alley co-founded Pixelworks, a fabless semiconductor company.

In 2000, Alley raised $66.1 million for Pixelworks, making it one of that year's top capital raises for semiconductors.

Politics

In February 2002, Alley accepted a Presidential appointment from President George W. Bush to sit on the U.S.-Japan Private Sector/Government Commission, which strove to promote sustainable economic growth in both countries.

In 2006, Alley was named as the Chairman of the Oregon Business Plan, which is tasked with helping shape public policy to promote economic growth, create jobs, raise incomes and reduce poverty in Oregon.

After stepping down as CEO of Pixelworks Inc. in 2007, Alley was hired to serve as a deputy chief of staff for Democratic Oregon Governor Ted Kulongoski. Included in Alley’s policy portfolio was economic development, technology, transportation, workforce training and energy.

Campaigns
In May 2008, Alley won the Republican primary for Oregon State Treasurer. Alley lost to Democratic state Senator Ben Westlund by 51% to 45% in the general election.

In 2009, Alley announced his candidacy for Governor of Oregon in 2010. He lost in the May 2010 Republican primary to wealth strategist and former NBA player Chris Dudley.

On January 3, 2011, Alley announced his candidacy for Oregon Republican Party Chairman. Alley gained support from numerous other Republican politicians and party leaders including U.S. Congressmen Greg Walden. Alley ran unopposed and on January 22, 2011 he was elected to the position.

On June 23, 2012, as Oregon GOP chairman, Alley directed that the Congressional District Convention be concluded at 5 p.m., which angered some supporters of the Ron Paul slate, who alleged that the adjournment was intended to prevent additional candidates from the slate from winning Alternate Delegate slots. On August 28, 2012, at the 2012 Republican National Convention, Alley reported the Oregon delegation's votes as 4 for Ron Paul, 1 for Rick Santorum, and 23 for Mitt Romney.

In November 2012, Alley announced he would not seek another term as Chairman, citing business concerns. He was succeeded in February 2013 by Suzanne Gallagher.

In 2016, Alley ran for Governor of Oregon a second time. He finished second in the Republican primary, losing to Bud Pierce.

Personal life
Alley married his wife Debbie in 1982 and they have three children. As of January 15, 2019, Allen and Debbie reside in Lake Oswego, Oregon.

Electoral history

References

External links
 Campaign website

1954 births
American computer businesspeople
Living people
Oregon Republican Party chairs
Politicians from Kalamazoo, Michigan
Politicians from Lake Oswego, Oregon
Krannert School of Management alumni
Purdue University College of Engineering alumni